An orangery is a greenhouse where orange trees were protected during the winter.

Orangery or Orangerie may also refer to:

 Orangery (Royal Garden of Prague Castle), Czech Republic
 Musée de l'Orangerie, in the Tuileries Gardens of Paris, France
 Versailles Orangerie, at the Palace of Versailles, near Paris, France
 Orangerie (Darmstadt), Darmstadt, Germany
 Orangerie (Kassel), Kassel, Germany
 Orangerie (Ansbach), Ansbach, Germany
 Orangery Palace, in Sanssouci Park, Potsdam, Germany

See also